Vodafone 360 Samsung M1 is a LiMo Platform based handset mobile phone released in November 2009.

References

Samsung mobile phones
Mobile phones introduced in 2009